Takhti or Tahti a surname. Notable people with the surname include:

Annikki Tähti (1929-2017), Finnish singer
Gholamreza Takhti (1930–1968), Iranian wrestler 
Ille Takhti (1889–1938), Russian Chuvash writer and folklorist
Jouni Tähti (born 1968), Finnish disabled pool player
Leo-Pekka Tähti (born 1983), Finnish Paralympian athlete